The 2022 North American, Central American and Caribbean Championships were a regional track and field competition held at Grand Bahama Sports Complex in Freeport, Bahamas, from August 19–21, 2022. It was the fourth edition of a senior track and field championship for the NACAC region, held four years after the 2018 NACAC Championships.

Medal summary

Men

Women

Rules state a country can only win two medals per event. In both the women's 5000 metres and 3000 metres steeplechase, the United States swept the event, however the bronze medals went to the fourth placed athletes.

Mixed

Medal table

Participating nations
According to an unofficial count, 329 athletes from 26 countries participated.

Schedule

References

External links
Bahamas 2022 Official Website
Official NACAC website
2022 NACAC Championships Homepage
2022 NACAC Championships Live Results

NACAC Championships
NACAC Championships in Athletics
Qualification tournaments for the 2023 Pan American Games
NACAC